The Georgetown Collegians were a minor league baseball team based in Georgetown, Texas. In 1914, the Collegians played the season as charter members of the Middle Texas League and were the only minor league team hosted in Georgetown.

History
Minor league baseball began in Georgetown, Texas in 1914. The Georgetown Collegians became charter members of the six–team Class D level Middle Texas League. The Middle Texas League began play the franchises based in Bartlett, Texas (Bartlett Bearcats), Belton, Texas (Belton Braves), Brenham, Texas (Brenham Brewers), Lampasas, Texas (Lampasas Resorters) and Temple, Texas (Temple Tigers) joining Georgetown in league play.

The "Collegians" moniker corresponds to Georgetown, Texas local history and origin. Georgetown, Texas was founded in 1875 from four existing colleges, including Southwestern University, the oldest university in Texas.

The Georgetown Collegians began play in the Middle Texas League on May 8, 1914. The league played a spit–season schedule. The Georgetown Collegians finished the season in 2nd place. With an overall record of 50–30, Georgetown finished 3.5 games behind 1st place Temple, playing under managers Jimmy Callahan and Elmer Gober. Georgetown did not qualify for the playoffs as the Temple Tigers won the first half standings and the Belton Braves won the second half standings. The final overall standings were led by the Temple Tigers (54–27), followed by the Georgetown Collegians (50–30), Brenham Brewers (50–34), Belton Braves (37–47), Lampasas Resorters (35–51) and Bartlett Bearcats (22–59). In the championship playoff, the Belton Braves defeated Temple.

The Georgetown franchise folded after the 1914 season. The Lampasas Resorters also folded following the season. Lampasas and Georgetown were replaced by the Austin Reps and Schulenburg Giants in the 1915 Middle Texas League.

Georgetown, Texas has not hosted another minor league team.

The ballpark
The name of the Georgetown home ballpark for hosting minor league games in 1914 is not directly referenced. In the era, the campus of Southwestern University, which began baseball play in 1884, would have had available facilities to host the team.

Year–by–year record

Notable alumni
No Georgetown Collegians alumni appeared in the major leagues.

References

External links
Georgetown, Baseball Reference

Defunct minor league baseball teams
Defunct baseball teams in Texas
Baseball teams established in 1914
Baseball teams disestablished in 1914
Georgetown, Texas
Middle Texas League teams
Williamson County, Texas